Harke & Burr are two fictional comic book characters who appeared in their own stories for thirteen episodes in issues of British comic Judge Dredd Megazine. The majority of the Harke & Burr stories were written by Si Spencer and drawn by Dean Ormston. Gordon Rennie co-wrote one story and Paul Peart provided the artwork for another. The name is a Spoonerism based on infamous body-snatchers Burke and Hare who committed the West Port murders.

Bibliography

They have only appeared in their own, eponymous strip:
 
"Antique and Curious" (by Si Spencer and Dean Ormston, in Judge Dredd Megazine #2.27-2.28, 1993)
"Hamster Horror" (by Si Spencer and Dean Ormston, in Judge Dredd Megazine #2.40-2.42, 1994)
"Grief Encounter" (by Si Spencer and Dean Ormston, in Judge Dredd Megazine #2.47-2.49, 1994)
"Secret Origin" (by Si Spencer and Paul Peart, in Judge Dredd Megazine #2.83, 1995)
"Satanic Farces" (by Gordon Rennie/Si Spencer and Dean Ormston, in Judge Dredd Megazine #3.04-3.07, 1995)

The characters also make a cameo appearance in the Judge Dredd novel Cursed Earth Asylum, by David Bishop (Virgin Books, December 1993)

"Antique and Curious", "Hamster Horror" and "Grief Encounter" were reprinted as a giveaway with the 350th edition of the Judge Dredd Megazine in July

External links
2000 AD page

2000 AD comic strips
2000 AD characters
1993 comics debuts
1993 comics endings
Science fiction comics
Comic strip duos
British comics characters
Comics characters introduced in 1993
Male characters in comics